Haligena is a genus of fungi in the Halosphaeriaceae family. This is a monotypic genus, containing the single species Haligena elaterophora.

References

External links
Haligena at Index Fungorum

Microascales
Monotypic Sordariomycetes genera